Hopewell is an unincorporated community in Fayette County, West Virginia, United States. It lies at an elevation of 1480 feet (451 m).

References

Unincorporated communities in Fayette County, West Virginia
Unincorporated communities in West Virginia